Ricardo Manuel Ciciliano Bustillo (September 23, 1976 – September 17, 2020) was a Colombian football midfielder.

Career 
Ciciliano was born in Barranquilla. From 2006, Ciciliano played at Millonarios where he achieved several remarkable feats. One of these was on November 19, 2006, when Millonarios played against Independiente Medellín; Millonarios was winning the match 1–0 and with 5 minutes remaining for the final whistle, Millonarios goalkeeper Jose Fernando Cuadrado was sent off. Without another goalkeeper available (Juan Carlos Henao was injured), Ciciliano took his place; he eventually saved the penalty kick awarded to Independiente Medellín as result of Cuadrado's foul, and Millos won the match.

Another notable achievement for Ciciliano was on October 24, 2007, when he scored 2 goals against the Brazilian club São Paulo FC, assuring Millonarios qualification for the Semi-finals of the Copa Sudamericana 2007. That same year he won Top Scorer in the Copa Sudamericana 2007 after scoring 6 goals in Millonarios. Ciciliano played for Colombia at the 1993 FIFA U-17 World Championship in Japan.

Ciciliano entered the intensive care unit of Clínica La Asunción in Barranquilla with pneumonia for complications of COVID-19 on September 6, 2020. He died there of his condition on September 17, 2020, at age 43.

Titles

Individual honours

 Top scorer in the Copa Sudamericana 2007 with Millonarios F.C.

References

1976 births
2020 deaths
Footballers from Barranquilla
Colombian footballers
Colombia youth international footballers
Colombian expatriate footballers
Deportivo Pereira footballers
Atlético Bucaramanga footballers
Deportes Tolima footballers
Deportivo Pasto footballers
Deportes Quindío footballers
Atlético Junior footballers
Deportivo Cali footballers
Millonarios F.C. players
Once Caldas footballers
Juan Aurich footballers
Uniautónoma F.C. footballers
Atlético Huila footballers
Categoría Primera A players
Peruvian Primera División players
Expatriate footballers in Peru
Association football midfielders
Deaths from pneumonia in Colombia
Deaths from the COVID-19 pandemic in Colombia